The Royal Mile is a succession of streets forming the main thoroughfare of the Old Town of the city of Edinburgh in Scotland.

Royal Mile or The Royal Mile may also refer to:

 "The Royal Mile", track on The 1984 Suite album by Mike Oldfield
"The Royal Mile (Sweet Darlin')", song on the 1980 Snakes and Ladders (Gerry Rafferty album)
The Royal Mile, 2013 republished version of Love's Pirate by Mary Daheim